Jocelyn Borida is a Malagasy politician. Borida was elected to the National Assembly of Madagascar as a member of the Tiako I Madagasikara party. He represents the constituency of Belo sur Tsiribihina.

External links
Profile on National Assembly site

Year of birth missing (living people)
Living people
Members of the National Assembly (Madagascar)
Tiako I Madagasikara politicians
Place of birth missing (living people)